Indian Institute of Information Technology, Nagpur (abbreviated IIITN) is one of the Indian Institutes of Information Technology (IIIT) and an Institute of National Importance located in Nagpur, Maharashtra. The institute started functioning from July 2016. It offers Bachelor of Technology (B.Tech.) courses in Electronics and Communication Engineering and Computer Science and Engineering. The institute has shifted to its permanent campus, at Waranga Nagpur.

Establishment
IIITN was approved by the Government of India's (GOI) Ministry of Human Resource Development (MHRD) in May 2015. IIITN has been set up on a Public–private partnership (PPP) basis. Fifty percent of the stakes are held by MHRD, whereas thirty-five percent is held by the Government of Maharashtra; the rest is held by industry partner Tata Consultancy Services.

VNIT was declared as IIITN's mentor institute, and VNIT director Narendra Chaudhari was appointed as IIITN's mentor director. The MHRD funded  for setting up of the institute, whereas Government of Maharashtra funded .

Courses
IIITN offers two B.Tech. courses in Computer Science and Engineering and Electronics and Communication Engineering with capacity of 210 and 140 seats respectively. The first ever batch capacity was of 40 students only. It plans to start Master of Technology (M.Tech.) and Doctor of Philosophy (PhD) courses from academic session of 2018–19. However, there is no update related to that till now. The tuition fees for newer batches has been increased to ₹180k/-.

References

External links
 

Engineering colleges in Nagpur
Nagpur
Educational institutions established in 2016
2016 establishments in Maharashtra